According to 2 Samuel, Adonijah (’Ǎḏōnīyyā; "my lord is Yah") was the fourth son of King David. Adonijah was born at Hebron during the long conflict between David and the House of Saul. In 1 Kings, he briefly proclaimed himself king of Israel during the terminal illness of his father David, before peacefully ceding the throne to his brother Solomon.

Life
After the death of his elder brothers Amnon and Absalom, Adonijah considered himself the heir-apparent to the throne. He acquired chariots and a large entourage. The king was unaware of this, being as he was "stricken in years" with his health failing him, and was in a different city. (KJV) Adonijah consulted and obtained the support of both the commander of the army Joab and the influential priest Abiathar. However, the priest Zadok; Benaiah, head of the king's bodyguard; Nathan, the court prophet; and others did not side with Adonijah.

In anticipation of his father's imminent death, Adonijah invited his brother princes and the court officials to a solemn sacrifice in order to announce his claim to the throne. He did not invite Solomon or any of his supporters. According to the Jewish Study Bible, by excluding Solomon, Adonijah demonstrates his awareness that he is in effect usurping the throne.

Assuming that Adonijah will soon move to eliminate any rivals or opposition, Nathan warns Bathsheba, Solomon's mother, and counsels her to remind the king of a previous promise to make Solomon his successor. Lillian R. Klein finds in Nathan's promise to confirm Bathsheba's statement a suggestion that her words may have required verification, and that there was no earlier definite promise in Solomon's favor. However KJV confirms in 1 Chronicles 29 and 2 Samuel 15 that David had indeed promised that Solomon would be anointed King.

However, Adonijah was supplanted by Solomon through the influence of Bathsheba, and through the diplomacy of the prophet Nathan. They induced David to give orders that Solomon should immediately be proclaimed and admitted to the throne, which David agreed.

After receiving word that Solomon had been crowned king, Adonijah's supporters quickly fled, while Adonijah took refuge at the altar. He later received a pardon for his conduct from Solomon on the condition that he showed himself a worthy man. Afterwards, Adonijah asked to marry Abishag from Shunem, who served his father David on his deathbed. Solomon, however, interpreting the request as a second attempt to gain the throne, denied authorization for such an engagement, even though Bathsheba now pleaded on Adonijah's behalf. Adonijah was then put to death.

See also
 Identity of Araunah

References

Children of David
Books of Kings people
Jewish royalty
Solomon
Biblical murder victims
Male murder victims
Heirs apparent who never acceded